Shukrani Elias Manya is a Tanzanian academic Professor and politician belonging to the Chama Cha Mapinduzi political party in Tanzania. He is a Member of Parliament nominated by John Magufuli and was appointed as a deputy minister responsible for mining since December 2020. Before his appointment he was the executive secretary of the Mining Commission in Tanzania.

See also

References

External link

Google Scholar Profile
LinkedIn Profile

 

1973 births
Living people
People from Mwanza Region
Tanzanian civil servants
Chama Cha Mapinduzi politicians
Chama Cha Mapinduzi MPs
Deputy government ministers of Tanzania
Tanzanian MPs 2020–2025
Nominated Tanzanian MPs
University of Dar es Salaam alumni
21st-century Tanzanian politicians